Golden Harvest Group is a Bangladeshi diversified conglomerate based in Dhaka. Rajeeb Samdani is the Managing Director of Golden Harvest Group. Mohius Samad Choudhury is the Director of Golden Harvest Group.

History 
Golden Harvest InfoTech Limited was established in 2000. It is an software export oriented company.

Golden Harvest Started manufacturing frozen food in 2006 in Bangladesh.

Golden Harvest founded Taher Ahmed Choudhury Charitable Hospital in 2006 at Bhadeshwar Union, Golapganj Upazila, Sylhet District.

Golden Harvest Developers Limited was established in 2009.

In January 2011 Golden Harvest Agro, was given an A grade by the British Retail Consortium.

Golden Harvest Group established Golden Harvest Foods Limited in 2012 to manufacture snacks such as chips and chanachur. It signed an agreement with Nippon Express to launch a joint venture company in Bangladesh. In October 2012, Golden Harvest Agro Industries received permission for their IPO on the Dhaka Stock Exchange.

In 2014, Golden Harvest launched a cold chain network with funding from USAID. It also received support from Cold Chain Bangladesh Alliance.

Golden Harvest is a sponsor of Dhaka Art Summit. Rajeeb Samdani is the founder of Dhaka Art Summit.

In March 2018, Golden Harvest signed an agreement with Jubilant FoodWorks to launch Domino's Pizza in Bangladesh. The first branch was opened in Dhanmondi on 15 March 2019 under a joint venture company called JV named Jubilant Golden Harvest Limited.

During the COVID-19 pandemic in Bangladesh, sales of frozen food increased for Golden Harvest. Frozen Paratha and bread sales increased while frozen snacks, such somosa, sausages, and ice cream, declined dramatically. Bangladesh Securities and Exchange Commission scrutinized Golden Harvest Agro Industries decision to provide 3.79 billion taka loans to its sister concerns without interest.

Businesses 

 Golden Harvest Agro Industries Limited
 Golden Harvest InfoTech Limited
 Golden Harvest Ice-Cream Limited (Bloop)
 Golden Harvest Foods Limited
 Golden Harvest Express
 Golden Harvest Dairy Limited
 Fatehpur Estate Limited
 Golden Harvest Developers Limited
 Golden Harvest Commodities Limited
 Nippon Express Bangladesh Limited, a joint venture with Nippon Express.
 Jubilant Golden Harvest Limited, joint venture with Jubilant FoodWorks.
 Cold Chain Bangladesh Limited, joint venture with International Finance Corporation.

Charities 

 Samdani Art Foundation, founded by Rajeeb Samdani and his wife, Nadia Samdani.
 Bangladesh Human Rights Foundation
 Taher Ahmed Choudhury Charitable Hospital
 JITA Bangladesh

See also 

 Toma Group
 Impress Group

References 

Organisations based in Dhaka
Conglomerate companies of Bangladesh
2000 establishments in Bangladesh